Rotamah Island, or Gellung-warl in the Kurnai language, is a river island in The Lakes National Park, in the Gippsland Lakes of Victoria, Australia, about  from Paynesville, from which it is accessible by boat.

Features
 Eucalypt and banksia woodland 
 Prolific bird life with over 190 species recorded
 Kangaroos, wallabies, possums, echidnas and Hog Deer

Recent history
 1975 - Purchased by the Victorian Government
 1978 - Rotamah and Little Rotamah Islands added to The Lakes National Park
 1979-2001 - Birds Australia leases the island's homestead to operate as the Rotamah Island Bird Observatory

References

External links
Parks Victoria - The Lakes National Park

Islands of Victoria (Australia)
East Gippsland
River islands of Australia